Rosemary Elizabeth Allan (1911-2008) was a British painter.

Biography

Allan was born in Bromley in Kent and attended the Central School of Arts and Crafts in 1928. She became a student at the Slade School of Fine Art in 1930 and would spend five years there. At the Slade she was taught by Randolph Schwabe and was awarded a scholarship in 1932. During a long career Allan showed works at the Royal Academy and with both the New English Art Club and the London Group. She had exhibitions at several commercial galleries including the Leicester Galleries, the Redfern Galleries and with the Wildenstein group. During World War Two, Allan worked for the Women's Voluntary Service, WVS, in Fairford, Gloucestershire, on evacuee settlement duties. Before the War ended, she completed a number of short-term commissions for the War Artists' Advisory Committee on the work of the WVS and the resulting watercolours are now held by the Imperial War Museum in London. A solo exhibition of her work was held at the Upper Grosvenor Galleries in 1971.

Personal life
Allen lived in Eastleach, Gloucestershire and was married to the artist Allan Gwynne-Jones, their daughter, Emily Gwynne-Jones, also became an artist. An exhibition of works by the Gwynne-Jones family was held in 1997.

References

External links

 

1911 births
2008 deaths
20th-century English painters
20th-century English women artists
Alumni of the Central School of Art and Design
Alumni of the Slade School of Fine Art
Artists from Kent
British war artists
English women painters
People from Bromley
People from Eastleach
World War II artists